Folkenstal is a cosplay artist from Switzerland who specializes in weaponry, armor, and other props featured in popular MMORPG video games including The Elder Scrolls V: Skyrim, The Elder Scrolls Online and The Legend of Zelda franchises.

Best known works
 The Elder Scroll from the video game The Elder Scrolls Online
 Banded Iron Armor from the video game The Elder Scrolls V: Skyrim 
 Khajiit Helmet from the video game The Elder Scrolls Online 
 Nordic ancient helmet from the video game The Elder Scrolls V: Skyrim 
 Cosplay Award Trophies for the Swiss convention Fantasy Basel

References

External links

Cosplayers
Living people
Year of birth missing (living people)